Chamblee is a train station in Chamblee, Georgia, serving the Gold Line of the Metropolitan Atlanta Rapid Transit Authority (MARTA) rail system. The station is bounded by New Peachtree Road on the East, Peachtree Road on the West and Chamblee Tucker road to the South. Chamblee Dunwoody Road is approximately ¼ mile to the north. A multi use trail has been completed between Keswick Park and Chamblee Tucker Road; this trail crosses under Peachtree Industrial Boulevard at Clairmont Road and ends at the Wal-Mart Shopping Center just southeast of the station. Chamblee has plans to connect this multi use trail at Keswick Park to an existing PATH trail that runs near Ashford Dunwoody Road between Blackburn Park and Murphey Candler Park. This station provides access to DeKalb-Peachtree Airport, Interactive College of Technology, Chamblee City Hall, and connecting bus service to Northlake Mall, Georgia State University (Dunwoody Campus), Peachford Hospital, Mercer University, Strayer University, the Georgia Vocational Rehabilitation Agency, North DeKalb Health Center, and the Veterans Administration Hospital.

Station layout

Parking
Chamblee has 1,713 daily parking spaces available for MARTA users which are located in paved parking lots. Long term parking is prohibited, as the paved parking lots are not owned by MARTA.

Nearby landmarks and popular destinations
DeKalb-Peachtree Airport
Chamblee High School
Chinatown, Atlanta
Interactive College of Technology
Chamblee Antique Row
Eco Lofts
Heritage Lofts
Lofts at 5300
Peachtree Malone Lofts
The Atrium Condos

Bus routes
The station is served by the following MARTA bus routes:

East bus bays
Route 19 - Clairmont Road
Route 47 - I-85 Access Road / Briarwood Road / Chamblee
Route 126 - Chamblee-Tucker Road

West bus bays
Route 103 - Peeler Road / North Shallowford Road
Route 132 - Tilly Mill Road
Route 825 - Johnson Ferry Road

External links

MARTA station page
nycsubway.org Atlanta page
Chamblee Tucker Road entrance from Google Maps Street View

Gold Line (MARTA)
Metropolitan Atlanta Rapid Transit Authority stations
Railway stations in DeKalb County, Georgia
Railway stations in the United States opened in 1987
1987 establishments in Georgia (U.S. state)
Chamblee, Georgia